Farmers Hill is a mountain located in the Catskill Mountains of New York east of Andes. Mount Pisgah is located north, and Fords Hill is located south of Farmers Hill.

References

Mountains of Delaware County, New York
Mountains of New York (state)